The Somaliland national football team is the football team that represents Somaliland, a self-declared republic that is internationally recognized as a de facto state. Although Somaliland is a de facto state, it has not yet received international de jure recognition. Somaliland is not a member of FIFA and CAF; it is, instead, an associate member of ConIFA, an association established in 2014 of teams from dependencies, unrecognised states, minorities, stateless peoples and regions that are not affiliated with FIFA.

History
The Somaliland Football Association currently runs a national league which consists of 12 semi-professional clubs sponsored or backed by both public and private organisations. The Association also holds a bi-annual inter-regional football tournament, in which all 13 regions participate in groups stages held across the country, with the final 4 group winners contesting the semi-finals in the capital Hargeisa.

The Somaliland Football Association for the first time in Somaliland’s existence took part in an international tournament in the conifa world cup 2016 hosted by Abkhazia. Somaliland was drawn in group D alongside Panjab and Sápmi. Losing both games Somaliland went on to play two further games against fellow runners up, the Chagos Islands and Székely Land. Somaliland went on to finish in 10th overall in the competition.

Following ConIFA's annual conference Somaliland Football Team was invited to compete at the 2016 ConIFA World Football Cup, where it finished tenth out of twelve teams.

Stadium 
Hargeysa National Stadium is the home of the national team.

Coaches

Current squad

|}

Association officials

See also 

 Non-FIFA international football
 ConIFA World Football Cup

References 

Football in Somaliland
Organisations based in Somaliland
African N.F.-Board teams
CONIFA member associations